The Bill Hunter Trophy was presented to the World Hockey Association's scoring leader in the regular season. 

It was named in honour of Bill Hunter, who founded the Alberta Oilers hockey club (which later became the Edmonton Oilers).

Winners
1973 – Andre Lacroix, Philadelphia Blazers
1974 – Mike Walton, Minnesota Fighting Saints
1975 – Andre Lacroix, San Diego Mariners
1976 – Marc Tardif, Quebec Nordiques
1977 – Real Cloutier, Quebec Nordiques
1978 – Marc Tardif, Quebec Nordiques
1979 – Real Cloutier, Quebec Nordiques

See also
Bill Hunter Memorial Trophy - for the top defenceman of the Western Hockey League

World Hockey Association trophies and awards